DJ-Kicks: Leon Vynehall is a DJ mix album, mixed by British DJ and producer Leon Vynehall. It was released in February 2019 under the Studio !K7 independent record label as part of their DJ-Kicks series.

Track listing

Charts

References

2019 compilation albums
DJ-Kicks albums
Leon Vynehall albums